Tisan Jeremiah Bako, popularly known as Tisan Bako, is a Nigerian radio personality and presenter. He is best known for hosting the drive time show Powerplay on Raypower 100.5 FM.

Early life
Tisan Jeremiah Bako was born in Sokoto on 16 April. He had his primary education at Command Children School, Ribadun Cantoment Kaduna, Nigeria, and secondary education in Ojo High School Ojo, Lagos. He also has a degree in Mass communication.

Career
Bako currently works Raypower 100.5 FM where he hosts the drive time show PowerPlay on Raypower 100.5 FM.

Awards and nominations

References

External links
Tisan Bako on Twitter

Nigerian radio presenters
Nigerian television presenters
Living people
Nigerian television talk show hosts
Residents of Lagos
People from Sokoto
Year of birth missing (living people)